Olympique Lyonnais Superleague Formula team is the racing team of Olympique Lyonnais, a football team that competes in France in the Ligue 1. The Olympique Lyonnais racing team competes in the Superleague Formula. It made its debut in the 2009 season and was operated by Barazi-Epsilon.

2009 season
Nelson Panciatici was confirmed as the driver of the Olympique Lyonnais entry.

Record
(key)

2009
Super Final results in 2009 did not count for points towards the main championship.

2010

2010 Mid-season changes
 Olympique Lyonnais skipped the Zolder round after parting company with driver Sébastien Bourdais.
 Round 7 at Brands Hatch saw the return of club Olympique Lyonnais with new driver Franck Perera and Laurent Rédon's team rebranded as Laurent Rédon Motorsport over the previous incarnation as LRS Formula.

References

External links
 Olympique Lyonnais Superleague Formula team minisite
 Official Olympique Lyonnais football club website

Olympique Lyonnais
Superleague Formula club teams
2009 establishments in France